Xenocalonectria is a genus of ascomycete fungi in the family Nectriaceae. It is a monotypic genus containing the sole species Xenocalonectria serpens.

References

External links 
 

Nectriaceae genera
Monotypic Sordariomycetes genera